Sarah Hennies (born 1979) is an American composer and percussionist based in Ithaca, New York. She is best known for her work as an acoustic group composer. She also contributes to improvisation, film, and performance art. She is currently a visiting assistant professor of music at Bard College.

Life and career
Hennies was born in 1979, in Louisville, Kentucky. She attended the University of Illinois, Urbana-Champaign and received a master's degree from the University of California, San Diego. Later, she moved to Ithaca, New York.

After her graduation, Hennies relocated to Austin, Texas, in 2003, and started collaborating with the guitarist Aaron Russell in the group Weird Weeds. In 2013, she founded her own record label, Weighter Recordings. Some of the musicians and ensembles with whom she has collaborated as a composer include Bearthoven, Bent Duo, Claire Chase, R. Andrew Lee, Talea Ensemble, Thin Edge New Music Collective, Two-Way Street, Nate Wooley, and Yarn/Wire. She is also a member of the music trio Meridian.

Hennies went through a gender transition in 2015 and much of her artwork reflects some aspects of her experience as a transgender woman. Her audio-visual work Contralto was premiered in 2017, featuring transfeminine identity issues and was nominated for the Queer|Art Prize in 2019.

Awards
Hennies is the recipient of an Artist Fellowship from New York Foundation for the Arts (2016) and the Grants to Artists Award (2019) from the Foundation for Contemporary Arts.

Works

Singles, extended plays and albums

Films
 Contralto (2017) — a multimedia documentary exploring transfeminism

References

1979 births
Living people
21st-century American composers
American women composers
Transgender women musicians
LGBT people from Kentucky
Transgender academics
Musicians from Louisville, Kentucky
Musicians from Ithaca, New York
University of California, San Diego alumni
University of Illinois Urbana-Champaign alumni
Transgender composers